Pholidochromis is a genus of ray-finned fishes from the subfamily Pseudochrominae, which is one of four subfamilies in the dottyback family Pseudochromidae. They occur in the western and central Pacific Ocean.

Species
There are two species in the genus:

 Pholidochromis cerasina  A.C. Gill & Tanaka, 2004 (Cherry dottyback) 
 Pholidochromis marginatus (Lubbock, 1980) (Margined dottyback)

References

Pseudochrominae
Taxa named by Anthony C. Gill